Levosulpiride, sold under the brand name Neoprad, is a typical antipsychotic and a prokinetic agent of the benzamide class. It is a selective antagonist of the dopamine D2 receptors on both central and peripheral nervous systems. Levosulpiride is claimed to have mood elevating properties. 

Chemically, it is the (S)-(−)-enantiomer of sulpiride.

Uses 
Levosulpiride is used in the treatment of:
 Psychosis
 Negative symptoms of schizophrenia 
 Anxiety disorders
 Dysthymia
 Vertigo
 Dyspepsia
 Irritable bowel syndrome 
 Premature ejaculation.
Levosulpiride is not currently licensed for treatment of premature ejaculation in the UK or other European countries.

Side effects 
Side effects include amenorrhea, gynecomastia, galactorrhea, changes in libido, and neuroleptic malignant syndrome. In the U.S., as of 2013 only one case of adverse reaction to levosulpiride had been recorded on the FDA Adverse Event Reporting System Database. A case of rapid onset resistant dystonia caused by low dose levosulpiride was reported in India.

Mechanism of action
In contrast to most other neuroleptics which block both D1 and D2 receptors, levosulpiride is more selective and acts primarily as a D2 antagonist. Levosulpiride appears to lack effects on norepinephrine, acetylcholine, serotonin, histamine, and gamma-aminobutyric acid (GABA) receptors.

Pharmacodynamics
Levosulpiride is a substituted benzamide derivative and a selective dopamine D2 antagonist with antipsychotic and antidepressant activity. Other benzamide derivatives include metoclopramide, tiapride, and sultopride.

See also
 Sulpiride
 Veralipride
 Benzamide

References 

Typical antipsychotics
Benzamides
Enantiopure drugs
GHB receptor ligands
Phenol ethers
Pyrrolidines
Sulfonamides